The 'Wesley Plattenburg House is a historic house in Selma, Alabama.  Featuring a unique combination of the Greek Revival and Italianate styles, it was completed in 1842 for Wesley Plattenburg.  Plattenburg was born on April 13, 1803, in Anne Arundel County, Maryland.  He had relocated to Selma and had assumed the occupation of tailor by 1829.  He became a successful merchant and served on the city council of Selma for many years.

The house was once at the center of a  plantation that Plattenburg inherited from a close friend, Mr. Wood, upon his death.  Plattenburg took up the vocation of planter after receiving the property.  The house is one of the few structures remaining in the city that is identifiable on a map of the Battle of Selma.  The city eventually grew to completely encompass the site.  The house was added to the Alabama Register of Landmarks and Heritage on March 22, 1991, and to the National Register of Historic Places on February 3, 1993.  It was listed on Alabama's Places in Peril in 2005.

References

External links

National Register of Historic Places in Dallas County, Alabama
Italianate architecture in Alabama
Greek Revival houses in Alabama
Houses completed in 1842
Houses in Dallas County, Alabama
Properties on the Alabama Register of Landmarks and Heritage
Historic American Buildings Survey in Alabama